Hebei Television (HEBTV), is a television network in Hebei province and all parts of the Beijing and Tianjin television viewing areas.  Hebei Television also covers parts of Shandong, Henan and Shaanxi provinces and the Inner Mongolia Autonomous Region. More than 120 million people enjoy access to the programs the television provides. Hebei Television has two channels, broadcasting 136 hours of programs and rebroadcasts programs from two other television stations. Besides, HEBTV broadcasts 2 hours of programs to North America each month via the Oriental Satellite Television.

Channels
HEBTV-1- A comprehensive channel, which broadcasts news, programs in the arts, movies and plays
 Its major programs are Hebei News Broadcast (Hebei Xinwen Lianbo), Economy Watch (Jingji Guancha), Society Focus (Shehui Shidian), Movie World (Dianying Da Shijie) and Sports Circle (Titan Neiwai).
HEBTV-2- Focuses on the economy
 It broadcasts major programs such as Economy Watch (Jingji Guancha), Economy Express (Jingji Chuanzhen), Securities Today (Jinri Zhengquan) and Economy Life (Jingji Shenghuo).
 HEBTV-3 (HEBTV-都市) – City
 Major programs: City Life (Dushi Shenghuo), Sports News (Tiyu Xinwen)
 HEBTV-4 (HEBTV-影视) – Movie & Television
 Major Programs: Circulation of Entertainment (Ying shi quan), Movie World (Ying shi da shi jie), Movie & TV Dictionary (Ying shi bao dian)
 HEBTV-5 (HEBTV-少儿科教) – Children & Education
 Major Programs: Military Files (Jun shi dang an), Growing (Cheng zhang), Children World (Shao er tian di), SF Movie Review (Kehuan yingshi shangxi) 
 HEBTV-6 (HEBTV-公共) – Public
 Major Programs: Happy 50 mins (Kuaile 50 fen), Law Time (Fazhi tian di), Chatroom (Liao tian shi)
 HEBTV-Farmer (HEBTV-农民) – Farmer & Agriculture
 Major Programs: San nong zui qian xian

The television station has three studios. Both the 800-square-meter and 400-square-meter studios are equipped with digital devices.

Programs
 Let's Go Together
 Perhaps Love
Couple List
Season 3 (2016)
 Heechul of Super Junior & Li Feier

References

External links
Official Site 
China Culture

Television networks in China
Mass media in Shijiazhuang
Television channels and stations established in 1998